Richard Mystrom (born 1944) is an American politician, businessman, and author who served as the 4th mayor of the Municipality of Anchorage from 1994 to 2000. He is a member of the Republican party.

Early life and education
Mystrom was born in Minnesota in 1944 and attended the University of Colorado Boulder. In 1964, he was diagnosed with Type 1 diabetes. He moved to Alaska in 1972.

Career 
In 1975, Mystrom established Mystrom/Beck Advertising. In 1982, he received the Small Business Person of the Year Award from President Ronald Reagan. In 1990, he sold his advertising business, which was later merged into the Nerland Agency.

Mystrom was elected to the Anchorage Assembly in 1979, serving until 1985. In 1994, he defeated Democrat Mark Begich to succeed Tom Fink as mayor of Anchorage. In 1997, he withstood a challenge from Fink, a fellow Republican. Mystrom was widely considered the more moderate of the two Republican candidates.

In office, Mystrom emphasized crime reduction and championed the "City of Lights" beautification program, encouraging residents and employers to ornament their homes and businesses with decorative lights during Anchorage's dark winter.

In the 2003 election, he challenged incumbent Republican mayor George Wuerch in a three-way race. Begich, who had unsuccessfully faced Wuerch in 2000, was elected.

Mystrom is a longtime advocate of bringing the Winter Olympic Games to Anchorage, and has chaired several committees to that end. Anchorage was twice the U.S. candidate for these Games (1992 and 1994).

Personal life
He has two sons, Nick and Richard, and a daughter, Jennifer, with his former wife, Mary.

References

External links

 

1943 births
Alaska Republicans
Anchorage Assembly members
Businesspeople from Alaska
Businesspeople from Minnesota
American advertising executives
Date of birth missing (living people)
Living people
Mayors of Anchorage, Alaska